History of New York may refer to:

History of New York (state), about the history of the State of New York
History of New York City, about the history of New York City

See also
New York (disambiguation)